This is a list of the Australian moth species of the family Notodontidae. It also acts as an index to the species articles and forms part of the full List of moths of Australia.

Notodontinae
Allata indistincta (Rothschild, 1917)
Antimima corystes Turner, 1931
Antimima cryptica Turner, 1917
Antithemerastis acrobela (Turner, 1922)
Archigargetta amydra (Turner, 1903)
Cascera bella Bethune-Baker, 1904
Cascera muscosa Walker, 1865
Cerura australis Scott, 1864
Cerura multipunctata Bethune-Baker, 1904
Commonia hesychima (Turner, 1922)
Destolmia lineata Walker, 1855
Ecnomodes sagittaria (T.P. Lucas, 1900)
Gallaba basinipha Turner, 1931
Gallaba duplicata Walker, 1865
Gallaba dysthyma Turner, 1931
Gallaba eugraphes Turner, 1922
Gallaba ochropepla Turner, 1903
Gallaba subviridis Turner, 1941
Gargettiana punctatissima (Bethune-Baker, 1916)
Hobartina amblyiodes (Turner, 1931)
Hobartina eusciera (Turner, 1931)
Hylaeora capucina R. Felder, 1874
Hylaeora caustopis Tepper, 1890
Hylaeora dilucida R. Felder, 1874
Hylaeora eucalypti Doubleday, 1849
Lasioceros aroa Bethune-Baker, 1904
Neola semiaurata Walker, 1855
Neostauropus viridissimus (Bethune-Baker, 1904)
Netria viridescens Walker, 1855
Omichlis hadromeres Turner, 1922
Omichlis hampsoni Bethune-Baker, 1904
Ortholomia moluccana C. Felder, 1861
Paradestolmia nigrolinea (T.P. Lucas, 1895)
Phalera amboinae C. Felder, 1861
Pheraspis mesotypa Turner, 1903
Pheraspis polioxutha Turner, 1903
Pheraspis rectilinea Turner, 1941
Pheraspis spodea Turner, 1903
Pheraspis symmetra Turner, 1917
Pheressaces cycnoptera (Lower, 1894)
Polychoa glauca (Turner, 1936)
Polychoa styphlopis Turner, 1906
Porsica acarodes (Turner, 1903)
Psalidostetha banksiae (Lewin, 1805)
Scythrophanes stenoptera Turner, 1926
Sorama bicolor Walker, 1855
Syntypistis chloropasta Turner, 1907
Syntypistis opaca Turner, 1922
Syntypistis viridigriseus (Rothschild, 1917)
Teleclita dryinopa (Dodd, 1902)
Timoraca meeki (Rothschild, 1917)

Pygaerinae
Clostera rubida (H. Druce, 1901)

Thaumetopoeinae
Aglaosoma periblepta (Turner, 1922)
Aglaosoma variegata (Walker, 1855)
Axiocleta perisema Turner, 1911
Cynosarga ornata Walker, 1865
Epicoma anisozyga Turner, 1922
Epicoma argentata (Walker, 1865)
Epicoma argentosa (T.P. Lucas, 1890)
Epicoma asbolina Turner, 1902
Epicoma barnardi (T.P. Lucas, 1890)
Epicoma barytima Turner, 1917
Epicoma chrysosema Turner, 1922
Epicoma contristis Hübner, 1823
Epicoma derbyana Strand, 1929
Epicoma dispar Turner, 1922
Epicoma melanospila (Wallengren, 1860)
Epicoma melanosticta (Donovan, 1805)
Epicoma phoenura Turner, 1922
Epicoma pontificalis Rosenstock, 1885
Epicoma protrahens (T.P. Lucas, 1890)
Epicoma signata (Walker, 1855)
Epicoma tristis (Donovan, 1805)
Epicoma zelotes Turner, 1902
Mesodrepta harpotoma Turner, 1924
Ochrogaster lunifer Herrich-Schäffer, 1855
Tanystola isabella (White, 1841)
Tanystola ochrogutta (Herrich-Schäffer, 1856)
Trichiocercus mesomelas (Walker, 1855)
Trichiocercus sparshalli (Curtis, 1830)

External links 
Notodontidae at Australian Faunal Directory

Australia
Notodontidae